Delta State is a state in southern Nigeria.

Delta State may also refer to:

Delta State (TV series), a Canadian animated television series
Delta State University, a university in Cleveland, Mississippi, US
Delta State University, Abraka, a university in Delta, Nigeria
Delta State University of Science and Technology, Ozoro, a University in Delta, Nigeria
Delta State Polytechnic, a set of three public institutions in Delta, Nigeria

See also
River delta
Delta College (disambiguation)
Delta University (disambiguation)